Since Arizona became a U.S. state in 1912, it has sent  congressional delegations to the United States Senate and United States House of Representatives. Each state elects two senators to serve for six years, and members of the House to two-year terms. Before becoming a state, the Arizona Territory elected a non-voting delegate at-large to Congress from 1864 to 1912.

These are tables of congressional delegations from Arizona to the United States Senate and the United States House of Representatives.

Current delegation

Arizona's current congressional delegation in the  consists of its two senators, one Democrat and one independent, and its nine representatives: 6 Republicans and 3 Democrats.

United States Senate

United States House of Representatives

1863–1912: 1 non-voting delegate 
Starting on December 5, 1864, Arizona Territory sent a non-voting delegate to the House.

1912–1943: 1 seat 
Following statehood on February 14, 1912, Arizona had one seat in the House.

1943–1963: 2 seats 
Following 1940 census, Arizona was apportioned two seats. For six years, the seats were elected at-large statewide on a general ticket. In 1949, districts were used.

1963–1973: 3 seats 
Following 1960 census, Arizona was apportioned three seats.

1973–1983: 4 seats 
Following 1970 census, Arizona was apportioned four seats.

1983–1993: 5 seats 
Following 1980 census, Arizona was apportioned five seats.

1993–2003: 6 seats 
Following 1990 census, Arizona was apportioned six seats.

2003–2013: 8 seats 
Following 2000 census, Arizona was apportioned eight seats.

2013–present: 9 seats 
Since 2010 census, Arizona has been apportioned nine seats.

Key

See also 

 List of United States congressional districts
 Arizona's congressional districts
 Political party strength in Arizona

Notes

References 

 
 
Arizona
Politics of Arizona
Congressional delegations